MP9 or MP-9 can refer to:

Brügger & Thomet MP9, a machine pistol
Interdynamic MP-9, a submachine gun
Ruger MP9, a submachine gun
MP9, a zone during the Eocene epoch
Mario Party 9, a 2012 Wii video game and the second and final game for the console